Junquillal Bay Wildlife Refuge, also called the Bahia Junquillal National Wildlife Refuge, is a  wildlife refuge in Guanacaste Province of northwestern Costa Rica. 

It is a part of the Guanacaste Conservation Area and the Area de Conservación Guanacaste World Heritage Site.

It protects areas of tropical dry forest and coastal mangroves.

References

External links 
 Costa Rica National Parks: Junquillal Bay Wildlife Refuge 

Nature reserves in Costa Rica
Geography of Guanacaste Province
Tourist attractions in Guanacaste Province